Manitoba Provincial Road 464 is a north-south provincial road in the southwestern section of the Canadian province of Manitoba.

Route description 
PR 464 is a north-south provincial road that begins at the Trans-Canada Highway near the unincorporated community of Hughes, and travels to its northbound terminus with the Yellowhead Highway west of Neepawa. 

The road provides north-south access to the unincorporated community of Brookdale, where it intersects with PR 353.

PR 464 is a gravel road for its entire length.

References

External links 
Manitoba Official Map - Southwest
 

464